Martuni Province is a province of the breakaway Republic of Artsakh, de jure part of the Republic of Azerbaijan.

History 
The territory was formed from the Soviet-era raion of Martuni District within the former Nagorno-Karabakh Autonomous Oblast. The eastern part of that district is under the control of the Azerbaijan. Martuni Province consists of the branch of the former Oblast which juts out farthest to the east, almost reaches Stepanakert on the west, and goes a little past Karmir Shuka on the south. The western half has many hills and small mountains, full of small villages, while the eastern half is very flat, with fewer villages, and the larger regional center of Martuni. Historically, this area was also known as Myus Haband and Varand. The Martuni Province has 35 rural communities and one urban community.

In 1991, the Azerbaijani parliament, with the Law on Abolishment of Nagorno-Karabakh Autonomous Oblast, abolished the Martuni District and forcibly consolidated its territory into the neighboring Khojavend District.

Sites of interest 
 Amaras Monastery, one of the oldest monasteries in the former Kingdom of Armenia.

Gallery

References 

Regions of the Republic of Artsakh
Martuni (province)